The Sassenpoort (English: Saxon Gate) is a gatehouse in the city wall of Zwolle, the Netherlands. It was built in 1409 out of dimension stone, mostly trachyte and tuff, and restoration work was done in 1893-1898. The gatehouse is a rijksmonument and is part of the Top 100 Dutch heritage sites.

History 
The city of Zwolle experienced its heyday during the 15th century. It became a member of the Hanseatic League in 1407, and the city gates represent the wealth of this period. In 1893 the city government of Zwolle gave the Sassenpoort to the Dutch national government, as a location to store the national archives, a function the building no longer serves. The building remains to this day property of the national government.

Building 
In the period between 1893 and 1898 restoration work took place. The dormers were made, and a neogothic spire clock tower was installed, replacing an earlier 18th century spire. In between the corner towers is a machicolation. From holes in the floor of this outer work, boiling oil could be thrown at enemies.

National monument 
The gatehouse became a rijksmonument on 13 February 1967 and is part of the Top 100 Dutch heritage sites. The national building service classifies the gate as "category I". This category contains monuments of which ownership and preservation by the state is considered of extraordinary cultural historic importance. In order to prevent damage by exhaust gasses, driving under the gate has been prohibited since 2010. The gate now serves as a pedestrian road. 

In 2006 TPG Post brought out a stamp in the series Mooi Nederland (beautiful Netherlands) with an image of the Sassenpoort.

References 

Rijksmonuments in Overijssel
Buildings and structures in Zwolle
Gatehouses (architecture)
Buildings and structures completed in 1409